Femuline is the fourth studio album by American recording artist Todrick Hall, released on June 8, 2021. The album is inspired by gay pride and its title refers to Hall embracing both his feminine and masculine sides. It features appearances from Chaka Khan, Brandy, Tyra Banks, Ts Madison, and Nicole Scherzinger. An extended version called Femuline Reloaded was released on November 17, 2021. It includes all songs from Femuline as well three new songs and three remixes of songs previously released.

Track listing

Notes
All song titles stylized in all caps except Boys in the Ocean.

References

2021 albums
Todrick Hall albums
LGBT-related albums